is a Japanese footballer currently playing as a forward for FC Gifu.

Career statistics

Club
.

Notes

References

External links

1994 births
Living people
Association football people from Yamaguchi Prefecture
Japanese footballers
Association football forwards
Japan Football League players
J3 League players
Fagiano Okayama players
Tegevajaro Miyazaki players
FC Gifu players